Bartholina is an orchid genus native to South Africa and Namibia.

A member of the Fynbos plant kingdom, Bartholina is also known as the "spider orchid". The common name comes from the array of long, narrow petal lobes that surround the flower, said to resemble the legs of a spider.

The genus is named after the seventeenth century Danish scientist Thomas Bartholin.

Two species are recognized:

 Bartholina burmanniana (L.) Ker Gawl. (syn, Bartholina pectinata) - Cape Province
 Bartholina etheliae Bolus - Namibia and Cape Province

References

External links 
 
 

 
Orchideae genera
Orchids of South Africa
Flora of Namibia